Resan (Swedish for The Journey) is a 1987 documentary film by Peter Watkins, made between the years 1983 and 1985 on several continents, and structured around the theme of nuclear weapons, military spending and poverty. Ordinary people are asked about their awareness of these issues.

With a running time of fourteen hours and thirty-three minutes, Resan is the second-longest non-experimental film ever made after Amra Ekta Cinema Banabo. It was screened at the 1987 Festival of Festivals as well as the "International Forum for New Cinema" of the Berlin Film Festival in 1987, but has rarely been seen since. In February 2007, it was screened at the Mexico City International Festival of Contemporary Cinema (FICCO) as part of a retrospective on Peter Watkins. Between April 25 and May 1, 2007, all nineteen parts of the film were screened at the Austrian Filmmuseum in Vienna, Austria as part of a retrospective on Peter Watkins..

References

Further reading

External links

 Brief review at the Chicago Reader
 information about the film from Peter Watkins' website

Films directed by Peter Watkins
Documentary films about nuclear war and weapons
1987 films
1987 documentary films
Australian documentary films
Canadian documentary films
Danish documentary films
Finnish documentary films
Italian documentary films
Japanese documentary films
New Zealand documentary films
Soviet documentary films
Swedish documentary films
Norwegian documentary films
1980s Canadian films
1980s Japanese films
1980s Italian films
1980s Swedish films